Zomebazam produced by Hoechst is a pyrazolodiazepinone derivative drug with anxiolytic properties. It is structurally related to  razobazam and zometapine.

Synthesis

The catalytic hydrogenation of N,2,5-trimethyl-4-phenyldiazenylpyrazol-3-amine CID:136203602 (1) over Raney Nickel gives 4-amino-1,3-dimethyl-5-methylaminopyrazole, CID:10219477 (2). Treatment with methyl malonyl chloride [37517-81-0] (3) gives 4-a-ethoxycarbonylacetylamino-1,3-dimethyl-5-methylaminopyrazole, CID:20561101 (4). Base catalyzed lactamization gives (5). The Goldberg reaction completes the synthesis Zomebazam (6).

See also
Benzodiazepine

References

GABAA receptor positive allosteric modulators
Lactams
Pyrazolodiazepines